Furcifer bifidus is a species of chameleon that is endemic to Madagascar. It was described by Alexandre Brongniart in 1800. The International Union for Conservation of Nature have ranked this species of chameleon as Least Concern.

Distribution and habitat
Furcifer bifidus is found in east Madagascar, and there is no known type locality. It can be found on the east of Madagascar north after the Mangoro River, and as far as Daraina and Marojejy National Park (Marojejy Massif). The two major threats to the Furcifer bifidus are logging for commercial reasons and the slash-and-burn method in agriculture. The species has been listed as protected.

Taxonomy
Furcifer bifidus was initially described by French chemist, mineralogist, and zoologist Alexandre Brongniart in 1800.

References

Furcifer
Endemic fauna of Madagascar
Reptiles of Madagascar
Reptiles described in 1800
Taxa named by Alexandre Brongniart
Fauna of the Madagascar lowland forests